AIAS may refer to:

 Academy of Interactive Arts & Sciences
 Aias the Great
 American Institute of Architecture Students
 Association Internationale Albert Schweitzer
 Anglo-Israel Archaeological Society
 Australian Institute of Aboriginal Studies, former name of Australian Institute of Aboriginal and Torres Strait Islander Studies (AIATSIS)